Coulee Dam is a town in Douglas, Grant, and Okanogan counties in the State of Washington. The Douglas County portion of Coulee Dam is part of the Wenatchee–East Wenatchee Metropolitan Statistical Area. The population was 1,211 as of the 2020 census.

History

Coulee Dam was founded by the U.S. Bureau of Reclamation in 1933, to serve as headquarters for the construction of the Grand Coulee Dam. The Okanogan County portion was known as Mason City, location of the head contractor. The Portions in Douglas and Grant Counties were known as Engineers Town and were government owned. In 1942 with the end of the contract in sight, CBI transferred control of Mason City to the Municipal Division of the Columbia Basin Project. In 1948 Mason City was incorporated into Coulee Dam. The government began the process of selling the town to the public in 1957, finishing in 1959. Coulee Dam was officially incorporated as a town on February 26, 1959.

Geography
Coulee Dam is located at  (47.968467, -118.978162).

The Okanogan County portion lies within the Colville Indian Reservation, and forms the southern limit of the Okanogan Highlands.

Climate
This climatic region is typified by large seasonal temperature differences, with warm to hot (and often humid) summers and cold (sometimes severely cold) winters.  According to the Köppen Climate Classification system, Coulee Dam has a humid continental climate, abbreviated "Dfb" on climate maps.

Demographics

2010 census
As of the census of 2010, there were 1,098 people, 459 households, and 301 families living in the town. The racial makeup of the town was 55.0% White, 0.5% African American, 35.5% Native American, 0.7% Asian, 2.4% from other races, and 5.9% from two or more races. Hispanic or Latino of any race were 6.7% of the population.

There were 459 households, of which 29.8% had children under the age of 18 living with them, 42.9% were married couples living together, 15.7% had a female householder with no husband present, 7.0% had a male householder with no wife present, and 34.4% were non-families. 30.5% of all households were made up of individuals, and 12.9% had someone living alone who was 65 years of age or older. The average household size was 2.39 and the average family size was 2.93.

The median age in the town was 41.6 years. 24.8% of residents were under the age of 18; 5.7% were between the ages of 18 and 24; 23.1% were from 25 to 44; 28.8% were from 45 to 64; and 17.5% were 65 years of age or older. The gender makeup of the town was 49.9% male and 50.1% female.

2000 census
As of the census of 2000, there were 1,044 people, 448 households, and 305 families living in the town. The population density was 1,532.5 people per square mile (592.8/km2). There were 499 housing units at an average density of 732.5 per square mile (283.3/km2). The racial makeup of the town was 64.56% White, 0.29% African American, 29.12% Native American, 0.48% Asian, 0.57% from other races, and 4.98% from two or more races. Hispanic or Latino of any race were 2.78% of the population.

There were 448 households, out of which 25.7% had children under the age of 18 living with them, 52.0% were married couples living together, 11.4% had a female householder with no husband present, and 31.7% were non-families. 27.7% of all households were made up of individuals, and 13.8% had someone living alone who was 65 years of age or older. The average household size was 2.32 and the average family size was 2.74.

In the town, the population was spread out, with 22.9% under the age of 18, 7.1% from 18 to 24, 20.7% from 25 to 44, 29.0% from 45 to 64, and 20.3% who were 65 years of age or older. The median age was 44 years. For every 100 females, there were 93.3 males. For every 100 females age 18 and over, there were 90.3 males.

The median income for a household in the town was $37,391, and the median income for a family was $45,066. Males had a median income of $38,000 versus $22,500 for females. The per capita income for the town was $18,791. About 6.7% of families and 9.8% of the population were below the poverty line, including 14.9% of those under age 18 and 11.0% of those age 65 or over.

References

Towns in Douglas County, Washington
Towns in Grant County, Washington
Towns in Okanogan County, Washington
Towns in Washington (state)
Wenatchee–East Wenatchee metropolitan area
Populated places in the Okanagan Country
Washington (state) populated places on the Columbia River
Company towns in Washington (state)